The Sony Xperia J is an Android smartphone from Sony. It was launched at the IFA 2012 in Berlin. It is also known as Sony ST26i.

Specifications

Design 
Xperia J is the first Sony Mobile device alongside the Xperia V that does not feature the Sony Ericsson's liquid energy logo after Sony acquired Ericsson's stake in Sony Ericsson in February 2012. The display is protected by Corning Gorilla Glass. It is available in black, gold, pink and white. It measures 124.3 x 61.2 x 9.2 mm and weighs 124 grams.

Hardware 
Xperia J has a  touchscreen with 480x854 resolution, a Qualcomm Snapdagon S1 system-on-chip with 1 GHz single core Cortex-A5 CPU and Adreno 200 GPU, a 5 megapixel rear camera, 512 MB of RAM, 4 GB of internal storage which can be extended up to 32 GB by a microSD/HC card, and a 1750 mAh battery.

Software 
Xperia J runs on Android 4.0.4 Ice Cream Sandwich out of the box. Sony updated this device for Android 4.1.2 Jelly Bean on 7 March 2013, which it lists as the "latest and final version" of the operating system.

References

External links
 Official website

Android (operating system) devices
Mobile phones introduced in 2012
Discontinued smartphones
J